Jacqueline Sue Scott (June 25, 1931 – July 23, 2020) was an American actress who appeared on Broadway and in several films, but mostly guest starred in more than 100 television programs.

Biography
The daughter of John and Maxine Scott, she settled down in Neosho, Missouri, where she graduated from Neosho High School in 1949. She then went to New York and attended Hunter College.

Her initial experience on stage came when she traveled with a tent show in Missouri. On Broadway she portrayed Susan Dennison in The Wooden Dish (1955) and Rachel Brown in Inherit the Wind (1955–57).

Scott made her motion picture debut in William Castle's Macabre (1958). During production of Macabre in 1957, she met Gene Lesser, and they were married a few months later.

She started her career in television by playing opposite such stars as Helen Hayes on live television. Between 1958 and 1960, Scott made three guest appearances on Perry Mason: Amelia Armitage in "The Case of the Daring Decoy" (1958), Sally Wilson in "The Case of the Glittering Goldfish" (1959), and Kathi Beecher in "The Case of the Violent Village" (1960). In the television series The Fugitive, Scott played the sister of Dr. Richard Kimble (David Janssen) in five episodes telecast between 1964 and 1967, including the two-part finale that at the time became the highest-rated program in television history.  Amongst her film roles, Scott played James Stewart's character's wife in the theatrical film Firecreek (1968), and the ill-fated outlaw wife of Walter Matthau in Charley Varrick (1973).

Death
Scott died on July 23, 2020 at her home in Los Angeles from lung cancer, just weeks after her husband of 63 years, actor Gene Lesser, died on June 23.

Filmography

References

Sources

External links

Interview with Jacqueline Scott at Classic Film & TV Cafe

1931 births
2020 deaths
American television actresses
American film actresses
American stage actresses
People from Sikeston, Missouri
People from Newton County, Missouri
Actresses from New York City
Actresses from St. Louis
Western (genre) television actors
Western (genre) film actresses
20th-century American actresses
21st-century American actresses
Neosho High School alumni
Deaths from lung cancer in California